Romance of the West may refer to:

 Romance of the West (1930 film), American western film
 Romance of the West (1946 film), American western film